Bryan F. Coker is an American academic administrator, and the 12th president of Maryville College. Coker was vice president and dean of students at Goucher College from 2013 to 2020, where he served as acting president during the summer of 2019. Coker was the dean of students at Jacksonville University from 2003 to 2013. He is an advocate for diversity, inclusion, and liberal arts education.

Early life and education 
Coker was raised in western North Carolina. He earned a Bachelor of Arts in psychology from Rhodes College. He was a classmate of Supreme Court Justice Amy Coney Barrett and they served together on the College Honor Council and as Resident Assistants. He was also a member of the Phi chapter of Kappa Sigma fraternity. Coker earned a master of education in student personnel services in higher education from University of South Carolina. In August 2010, he completed a Ph.D. in higher education administration from University of Tennessee (UT). His dissertation was titled, The Operationalization of the Doctrine of In Loco Parentis: The Administrative Council of the University of Tennessee in the Early 1920s and 1930s. Coker's doctoral advisor was Norma T. Mertz.

Career 
Coker worked for six years at UT-Knoxville, starting in student affairs administration, and from 1999 to 2003 served as the director of student judicial affairs. From 2003 to 2013, Coker was the dean of students at Jacksonville University (JU), where he led the planning and implementation of the Student Solutions Center to address and resolve student concerns, and also created a first-year student residential experience program. Coker taught college transition courses and served as an academic advisor for first-year students. He created a leadership council to address student diversity issues. Coker was recognized as an LGBT ally by a consortium of local advocacy groups for his efforts to provide domestic partner benefits to employees and his revisions to the residential life policies regarding gender-neutral housing.

On February 4, 2013, Coker succeeded Gail Edmonds as the vice president and dean of students of Goucher College, serving as the chief student affairs officer. Beginning in January 2017, Coker was an affiliated faculty member in the School of Education and Urban Studies at Morgan State University. Coker is an advocate for diversity, inclusion, and liberal arts education. In 2018, Coker graduated from the Council of Independent Colleges and American Association of State Colleges and Universities Executive Leadership Academy. He assisted Goucher president, José Antonio Bowen with the "Undaunted" capital campaign to raise $100 million, and created partnerships with businesses and organizations in Maryland. Coker served as the acting president of Goucher in the summer of 2019. He was also a peer evaluator for the Middle States Commission on Higher Education.

On July 1, 2020, Coker succeeded Tom Bogart as the president of Maryville College.

Personal life 
Coker met his wife, Sara Barnette Coker, at Rhodes College. They have four children. Sara Coker is the co-founder of a Jacksonville-based nonprofit that brought Afghan children to Florida for medical care. Coker is a lifelong Presbyterian, and is an ordained elder and liturgist in the Presbyterian Church (USA). The Cokers reside in the Oak Park Historic District of Maryville, Tennessee.

References 

Living people
Place of birth missing (living people)
Academics from North Carolina
American university and college faculty deans
Goucher College faculty and staff
Rhodes College alumni
University of South Carolina alumni
University of Tennessee alumni
University of Tennessee faculty
Jacksonville University faculty
American Presbyterians
Maryville College
American LGBT rights activists
Presidents of Goucher College
1973 births